The Peru national under-17 football team represents Peru in international under-17 football competitions and is overseen by the Federacion Peruana de Futbol.

Despite the current failures of the senior side, the Peruvian U-17 team has given brand new stars and hopes to Peruvian fans early in the year of 2007. After their first FIFA U-17 World Cup appearance in 2005 (Peru as host nation), the youth team greatly improved in skill and determination. Their first U-17 World Cup saw them lose with merely 1 point. Yet, they started the 2007 FIFA U-17 World Cup with a bang as they defeated the local South Korean team with an array of constant attacks and effective counter-attacks that completely overwhelmed their opponents.

The U-17 team's success in 2007 came from the leadership of Juan Jose Ore, and the appearance of good players like Reimond Manco. Not only that, but Peru showcased some of the best team games of the South American tournament and in the 2007 World Cup. Although they were eliminated during the quarterfinals, Peru's U-17 squad seems to be having high hopes for future competitions.

Peru was originally to host the 2019 FIFA U-17 World Cup, it would have been the second time to be hosted by Peru. However, FIFA released a press statement on 22 February 2019 stating that Peru would no longer host the tournament following inspection of the facilities and concern over organisational challenges.

Peru will host the 2021 FIFA U-17 World Cup, it will be the second time to be hosted by Peru.

South American U-17 Championship Records

1 Under 16 Championships

Road to the 2007 U-17 World Cup
In 2007, the Peruvian U-17 football team went to the 2007 South American Under-17 Football Championship that was held in Ecuador that started March 4 of that year. In the debut match, the Peruvian team had to face the Brazil. The Peruvians surprised the Brazilians 2–1 with one goal scored by Reimond Manco and the impressive forward La Torre.

In the group stage, Peru won most of the matches and ended first in its group (qualifying to the final round).

In the final round of the tournament (where the first 4 qualified to the 2007 FIFA U-17 World Cup) Peru won the first match against Venezuela. In the next match, Brazil crushed Peru 4–0 and Colombia trounced them 3–0. By the fourth match Brazil, Colombia and Argentina were already qualified for the main tournament and Peru, Venezuela and host Ecuador had to fight for the last qualification spot.

The fifth match saw Peru with the obligation to defeat Ecuador. The match started horribly for Peru when an Ecuadorian midfielder scored at the first minutes of play. Peru answered quickly when Reimond Manco assisted midfielder Sanchez for a goal. Ecuador was seen to have determination, and it scored once again at the 20th minute of the first half. However, Reimond Manco scored goal caused by a mistake from the Ecuadorian Mendoza, sending them one huge step closer to the world tournament and eliminating their fierce rivals.

For the last match against Argentina, Peru had to lose by at least 4 goals to be eliminated. Peru was capable of drawing the match and classified to the U-17 World Cup. Reimond Manco was named as the best player of the competition by the CONMEBOL.

Road to the 2019 U-17 World Cup
Peru automatically qualified for the 2019 World Cup as host, but ended up ripped its hosting right on 22 February 2019 due to infrastructure concerns. Thus, Peru was forced to enter to the run for the World Cup, which was moved to Brazil. Peru failed to qualify for the tournament, after only managed a lone 3–2 win over Uruguay, which was not enough comparing to Ecuador's 4–1 win over eventual champions Argentina.

Road to the 2021 U-17 World Cup
Peru automatically qualified for the 2021 World Cup as host.

South American Games Records

The South American Games (a.k.a. ODESUR Games; Spanish: Juegos Sudamericanos) are a regional multi-sport event held between nations from South America, organized by the South American Sports Organization (Organización Deportiva Sudamericana, ODESUR).

The Peruvian U-17 football team achieved its first gold medal in the 1990 South American Games, which they were the hosts, and 2 bronze medals in 1982 and 1994 respectively.

FIFA U-17 World Cup record

2019 U-17 World Cup
Peru would have automatically qualified as the hosts of the 2019 FIFA U-17 World Cup. However, FIFA renounced Peru's rights on 22 February 2019 and replaced them with Brazil.

2021 U-17 World Cup
Peru will host and automatically qualified as the hosts of the 2021 FIFA U-17 World Cup.

Squads

Current squad
The following players were selected to take part in the 2015 South American Under-17 Football Championship.

Manager:  Juan José Oré

See also
Peru national football team
Federacion Peruana de Futbol

References

under-17
South American national under-17 association football teams